TV total is a German late-night television comedy talk show which originally aired from 8 March 1999 to 16 December 2015 on ProSieben, hosted, created and produced by entertainer Stefan Raab. Following a six-year hiatus, it was revived on 10 November 2021 with Sebastian Pufpaff as host.

Concept and history
TV total focused in particular on mocking the funniest moments from other shows on German television; it also presented Raab in reports and challenges taking place inside and outside of the studio, and interviewing national and international celebrity guests. Raab is bilingual and interviewed his English-speaking guests in English with little or no assistance by off-stage interpreters. Notable guests were the bands Red Hot Chili Peppers, Green Day, Linkin Park, Coldplay, Morten Harket, Adam Green, U2, Keane, Oasis, Metallica, and Manowar, martial-arts star Jackie Chan, Kevin Costner, 50 Cent, Eminem, D12, Mark Wahlberg, Jack Black, Jon Bon Jovi, Ewan McGregor, Dwayne Johnson, Janet Jackson, Rihanna, Jay-Z, Alicia Keys, t.A.T.u., Justin Bieber, Psy, Sting, Paris Hilton, and Kylie Minogue.

Episodes of TV total were recorded in a studio in Cologne in the afternoon before an audience of around 250 people and televised a few hours later at night. The show's set included a mobile interview stage that could be moved from one side of the studio to the other. A large desk on that stage contained buttons with hilarious sounds and video clips before Craig Ferguson's The Late Late Show (CBS TV series). The show had its own band, the Heavytones, and most of the guest musicians and comedians regularly performed live on stage.

TV total was broadcast once a week (on a Monday) from its beginning in 1999 to February 2001 and usually four times per week (Monday to Thursday) from March 2001 to the cancellation of the show in December 2015. The show paused during the summer for up to two months. Special episodes were produced occasionally. Notable examples included live episodes that emphasized soccer during the FIFA World Cup 2002 and 2006 and the Euro 2004, live episodes from New York when Raab and his team visited the Super Bowl XVIII, one episode that summarized the most recent calendar year shortly before Christmas, New Year's Eve Specials, and up to six episodes per year that featured Raab and other celebrities playing Texas Hold'em.

In February 2001, Elton started as Raab's intern and sidekick and had frequent appearances on the show, for example as a quizmaster for the weekly rubric Blamieren oder Kassieren (literally: to blunder or to cash).

In 2006, Stefan Raab managed to start a new talent contest that was shown as a bonus within his TV total show. This was named "SSDSGPS" (acronym for: Stefan sucht den Super-Grand-Prix-Star, meaning Stefan seeks the Super Grand-Prix Star) and only had a total of four attendees; this was a mock on the acronym DSDS for the German version of Pop Idol running on RTL. The winner of the show, a German singer named Max Mutzke, then performed at the Eurovision Song Contest for Germany. Though he only made it to the eighth position, he later became a quite successful singer and artist in Germany and Austria. The show later had another singing competition that finally carried it to extremes – Raab's talent contest SSDSDSSWEMUGABRTLAD (acronym for: Stefan sucht den Superstar, der singen soll, was er möchte, und gerne auch bei RTL auftreten darf, meaning: "Stefan seeks the Superstar who shall sing what he wants and who may perform on RTL if he likes") was meant as a mock on RTL Television. He created it when Deutschland sucht den Superstar candidate Max Buskohl accepted an invitation to appear in TV total after he left the show in April 2007 but was denied this performance by RTL who cited their existing contract. Raab then started a campaign called Freiheit für Max Buskohl ("Freedom for Max Buskohl") that got attention for using an edited RAF kidnapping photo. After this campaign failed he started his new casting show. The winner was Stefanie Heinzmann. Raab self-deprecates himself by insulting RTL within the show.

From 2 February until 12 March 2010, the TV-broadcasters ProSieben and Das Erste (ARD) collaborated to find Germany's entry for the Eurovision Song Contest 2010. After eight Unser Star für Oslo-Shows, Lena Meyer-Landrut was voted to represent Germany at the Eurovision Song Contest 2010, where she won with 246 points, marking Germany's second victory at the competition after Nicole had won in 1982. Lena Meyer-Landrut also represented Germany in the Eurovision Song Contest 2011 taking place in Düsseldorf, where she finished tenth.

Raab announced his retirement from show business on 17 June 2015. The final episode was broadcast on 16 December 2015. It featured Raab and Elton reminiscing about the history of the show and concluded with Raab and Elton exiting the studio waving towards the audience.

Criticism
TV total was criticized multiple times by the media, mostly because of the exposure of (mostly random and inexperienced) people to mockery. German tabloid paper Bild called Raab the "evil of German TV" after he had edited a kidnapping photo of the former German terrorist organization Red Army Faction for a campaign of one of his casting shows. German politician Wolfgang Bosbach thought TV totals ratings largely depended on the amount of "trash" depicted in the show. In a 2015 review, Der Spiegel journalist Jonas Leppin summarized that the TV totals current nature was missing the humor and creativity of the first years of the show and Raab had lost most of his dedication, which ultimately caused the ratings to drop below the 1 million mark. TV total and Raab himself were subject to a couple of lawsuits.

External links
 
 MySpass.de: TV total show archive (1999–2003 and 2007–2015) 

1999 German television series debuts
2015 German television series endings
1990s German television series
2000s German television series
2010s German television series
2020s German television series
ProSieben original programming
German television talk shows
Television shows set in Cologne
German-language television shows
Television series revived after cancellation